Sljeme may refer to:
 Sljeme, mountain peak of Medvednica, Croatia
  Sljeme transmitter, TV/radio transmitter on Sljeme peak
 Sljeme (company), Croatian malletier atelier